Qian Kuan ( 835 – 16 May 895), courtesy name Hongdao, was the father of the warlord Qian Liu who founded the Wuyue kingdom.

Qian Kuan's tomb was discovered in October 1978 in Xishu Village (西墅村), Jinbei Subdistrict (锦北街道), Lin'an City, not far from his wife Lady Shuiqiu's tomb which was discovered 2 years later. Though it survived the Cultural Revolution, Qian Kuan's tomb had been robbed at some point in history.

References

 

830s births
895 deaths